Altomare may refer to the following people:

Bobby Alto (Robert Altomare, 1938–2012), American actor, comedian and performer
Christy Altomare (born 1986), American actress and singer-songwriter
Massimo Altomare (m:A Fog) (born 1979), Italian heavy metal musician
Tony Altomare (1928–2003), American professional wrestler
Brittany Altomare (born 1990), American professional golfer